Below are the rosters for teams that competed in the 2020 World Junior Ice Hockey Championships.

Group A

Head coach:  Raimo Helminen

Head coach:  Sergei Starygin

Head coach:  Róbert Petrovický

Head coach:  Tomas Montén

Head coach:  Thierry Paterlini

Group B

Head coach:  Dale Hunter

Head coach:  Václav Varaďa

Head coach:  Tobias Abstreiter

Head coach:  Valeri Bragin

Head coach:  Scott Sandelin

External links
WM20 - International Ice Hockey Federation

Rosters
World Junior Ice Hockey Championships rosters